Gerry Mullan is a Northern Ireland international footballer who played as a striker. At club level, he featured for Ballymena United, Everton, Glentoran and Coleraine.

Career
Mullan was born in Limavady. When Ronnie McFall signed Mullan for Glentoran in 1981 from Everton, he became the most expensive Irish League player, at £30,000. He scored 110 goals for Glentoran, with his season's best being 27.

Mullan was capped four times for Northern Ireland in 1983.

Honours
Ballymena United
County Antrim Shield: 1980
Ulster Cup: 1981

Glentoran
Irish League: 1988
Irish Cup: 1983, 1985, 1986, 1987, 1988
Gold Cup: 1987
Ulster Cup: 1983, 1984
County Antrim Chalice: 1988

References

Living people
Year of birth missing (living people)
People from Limavady
Association footballers from Northern Ireland
Northern Ireland international footballers
Association football forwards
Limavady United F.C. players
Ballymena United F.C. players
Everton F.C. players
Glentoran F.C. players
Coleraine F.C. players
NIFL Premiership players